Mofatteh is a station of Mashhad Metro Line 2. The station opened on 17 August 2017. It is located on Tabarsi Boulevard.

References

Mashhad Metro stations
Railway stations opened in 2017
2017 establishments in Iran